Phytoecia hovorkai is a species of beetle in the family Cerambycidae. It was described by Pierre Téocchi and Jérôme Sudre in 2009. It is known from Kenya.

References

Phytoecia
Beetles described in 2009